Julia Hütter (born 26 July 1983) is a female pole vaulter from Germany. She set her personal best (4.57 metres) on 10 August 2007 at a meet in Leverkusen.

Competition record

References
trackfield.brinkster

1983 births
Living people
German female pole vaulters
Universiade medalists in athletics (track and field)
Universiade gold medalists for Germany
Medalists at the 2005 Summer Universiade